Sangat  is a 2015 Pakistani romantic drama serial airing on Hum TV. The series is directed by Kashif Nisar and produced by Moomal Entertainment. It stars  Mikaal Zulfiqar and Saba Qamar in lead roles and Zahid Ahmed as antagonist. It airs Thursday evenings on Hum TV. Sangat is one of the Highest Rated Drama Series of 2015 and gained high trps

Synopsis

Sangat revolves around the tale of Adnan (Mikaal Zulfiqar) and Ayesha (Saba Qamar) and how their lives change when Ayesha is raped by Shavez (Zahid Ahmed), giving birth to a baby girl named Sangat. On her 'Aqiqah' ceremony, Adnan's sister lights up some candles which create smoke and Sangat has trouble breathing. When they take Sangat to a hospital, the doctors say that she has Thalassemia and they give a DNA test, proving that Sangat is not Adnan's daughter. At first, Adnan doesn't believe it, but later he gets the DNA test again from a different hospital but the result is same. Then, he confronts Ayesha, and she tells him everything she went through. At first, he ask who assaulted her, but she lies and says she doesn't know and he had a cloth around him. Adnan later gets drunk and stays away for Sangat. Shavez has to keep on donating blood and eventually comes closer to Sangat; playing with her, taking care for her etc. Shavez however, has in own problems. He wants to leave the city but her aunt (Ayesha's mum) is telling him that he should get married and then move with his wife (Salma). After seeing Shavez emotionally attached to Sangat, Ayesha tells him not to leave and stay with her mum. Salma on the other side, is jealous of Shavez's relationship with Ayesha and wants the marriage to proceed quickly as possible. Shavez is having second thoughts about the wedding as if he isn't going to move, then he doesn't need to get married and ends up in Ayesha problems. Adnan wants to stay with Ayesha, but she thinks they shouldn't as Sangat will always be a part of her life and therefore to reaccept Ayesha, he will have to reaccept Sangat. Adnan cannot do so, so he lets Ayesha stay in her mothers house with Shavez, unaware that he is the man that assaulted Ayesha. Ayesha lies to her mum about the operation being the problem as to why she needs some rest. Adnan's sister and mother both try to figure out why the relationship is breaking but they are not able to as Adnan is lying about the operation money, (they need a lot of money for the operation). With Ayesha and Shavez living in the same house they are becoming even closer and Ayesha has now had a change of heart and tries to keep her calm from Shavez.
In the next episode, we see that Shavez has broken off the marriage and returns to his house to visit his mum. In a rage of anger he decides to shoot himself, only to be begged by Ayesha not to. When Shavez disagrees, Ayesha yells and says Sangat is your daughter. Now wanting to leave his daughter he decides to stay in the house with Sangat and finally telling her mom the truth. Luckily, he manages not to but tells Salma who admits she is jealous of their relationship and wants to hear the truth. On the other hand, Ayesha tells Adnan's sister the truth and she is guilt-ridden of hiding it from her mum. In the end Adnan shoots Shavez and returns to Ayesha. He tells Ayesha, 'I killed Shavez cause first he snatched you away from me and now he was taking away my Sangat'.

Cast
 Mikaal Zulfiqar as Adnan
 Saba Qamar as Aisha/Aashi
 Zahid Ahmed as Shavez
 Kiran Haq as Farah
 Samina Ahmad as Adnan and Farah's mother
 Saba Faisal as Aisha's mother
 Tariq Jameel as Shavez's father
 Adnan Shah Tipu as Maulvi
 Haseeb Khan
 Tahira Imam as Salma's mother
 Sonia Mishal as Salma
 Anjum Habibi
 Haseeb Khan
 Munazzah Arif as Aisha's aunt

Criticism
The show was criticised due to its misogynistic, sexist and regressive approach. There was controversy in the serial that rapist was shown as an innocent man and a married woman attracts towards the rapist. Zafar Meraj, the creator of the play, admits that it was his failure not to convey the message correctly. He gave the reason that Hero type actor Zahid Ahmed was cast in the role of the rapist, otherwise the impression would have been different.

International broadcast 
It was aired on Hum Europe in the UK, on Hum World in Canda, USA and Australia and Hum TV Mena on UAE with same timings and premiered date. All International broadcasting aired the series in accordance with their standard times. On Hum World, reruns began 12 December 2018 Mon-Thur 09:00pm EST.

In Mauritius, the show was broadcast by MBC 2. It premiered on 20 November 2020 and aired from Monday to Friday 16:30.

References

External links
 Hum TV official website

Hum TV original programming
Urdu-language television shows
Pakistani drama television series
2015 Pakistani television series debuts
2016 Pakistani television series endings